Public Works Act (with its variations) is a stock short title used in New Zealand and the United Kingdom for legislation relating to public works.

List

New Zealand
The Public Works Act 1876 (40 Vict No 50) 
The Public Works Act 1876 Amendment Act 1878 (42 Vict No 44) 
The Public Works Act 1879 (43 Vict No 44) 
The Public Works Act 1880 (44 Vict No 54) 
The Public Works Act 1882 (46 Vict No 37)
The Public Works Act 1882 Amendment Act 1883 (47 Vict No 38) 
The Public Works Act 1882 Amendment Act 1884 (48 Vict No 14) 
The Public Works Act 1882 Amendment Act 1885 (49 Vict No 7)
The Public Works Act 1882 Amendment Act (No 2) 1885 Act 1885 (49 Vict No 42)
The Public Works Acts Amendment Act 1887 (51 Vict No 36) 
The Public Works Acts Amendment Act 1889
The Public Works Acts Amendment Act 1892
The Public Works Acts Amendment Act 1893
The Public Works Act 1894
The Public Works and Government Railways Acts Amendment Act 1895 (59 VICT 1895 No 47)
The Public Works Acts Amendment Act 1900 (64 Vict No 47) 
The Public Works Amendment Act 1901 (1 Edw 7 No 68)
The Public Works Act 1903 (3 Edw 7 No 93) 
The Public Works Amendment Act 1904 (4 Edw 7 No 46) 
The Public Works Amendment Act 1905 (5 Edw 7 No 10)
The Public Works Acts Compilation Act 1905 (5 Edw 7 1905 No 53) 
The Public Works Act Amendment Act 1906 (6 Edw 7 1906 No 30)
The Public Works Amendment Act 1908 (8 Edw 7 No 241) 
The Public Works Amendment Act 1909 (9 Edw 7 No 19) 
The Public Works Amendment Act 1910 (1 Geo 5 No 66) 
The Public Works Amendment Act 1911 (2 Geo 5 No 21) 
The Public Works Amendment Act 1913 (4 Geo 5 No 38) 
The Public Works Amendment Act 1914 (5 Geo 5 No 49) 
The Public Works Amendment Act 1923 (13 Geo 5 No 29) 
The Public Works Amendment Act 1924 (15 Geo 5 No 46) 
The Public Works Amendment Act 1925 (16 Geo 5 No 47) 
The Public Works Amendment Act 1927 (18 Geo 5 No 69) 
The Public Works Amendment Act 1928 (19 Geo 5 No 15)
The Public Works Act 1928 (19 Geo 5 No 21) 
The Public Works Amendment Act 1935 (26 Geo 5 No 27) 
The Public Works Amendment Act 1947 (11 Geo 5 No 46) 
The Public Works Amendment Act 1948 (No 39) 
The Public Works Amendment Act 1952 (No 58) 
The Public Works Amendment Act 1953 (No 23) 
The Public Works Amendment Act 1954 (No 85) 
The Public Works Amendment Act 1955 (No 59) 
The Public Works Amendment Act 1956 (No 39) 
The Public Works Amendment Act 1958 (No 28) 
The Public Works Amendment Act 1960 (No 105) 
The Public Works Amendment Act 1961 (No 32) 
The Public Works Amendment Act 1962 (No 41) 
The Public Works Amendment Act 1963 (No 42) 
The Public Works Amendment Act 1964 (No 107) 
The Public Works Amendment Act 1965 (No 26) 
The Public Works Amendment Act 1967 (No 31)
The Public Works Amendment Act (No 2) 1967 (No 113)
The Public Works Amendment Act 1970 (No 145) 
The Public Works Amendment Act 1971 (No 124) 
The Public Works Amendment Act 1972 (No 96) 
The Public Works Amendment Act 1973 (No 44) 
The Public Works Amendment Act 1974 (No 16) 
The Public Works Amendment Act 1975 (No 138) 
The Public Works Amendment Act 1976 (No 165) 
The Public Works Amendment Act 1977(No 169)
The Public Works Act 1981 (1981 No 35)
The Public Works Amendment Act 1982 (No 182) 
The Public Works Amendment Act 1983 (No 150) 
The Public Works Amendment Act 1987 (No 62)
The Public Works Amendment Act (No 2) 1987 (No 67) 
The Public Works Amendment Act (No 3) 1987 (No 110) 
The Public Works Amendment Act (No 4) 1987 (No 201)
The Public Works Amendment Act 1988 (No 43) 
The Public Works Amendment Act 1991 (No 87)
The Public Works Appropriation Act 1886 (50 Vict No 55) 
The Public Works Appropriation Act 1887 (51 Vict No 43) 
The Public Works Appropriation Act 1888
The Public Works Appropriation Act 1889
The Public Works Appropriation Act 1890
The Public works Appropriation Act 1891
The Public Works Appropriation Act 1892
The Public Works Appropriation Act 1893 
The Public Works Appropriation Act 1894 
The Public Works Appropriation Act 1895 (59 Vict No 72) 
The Public Works Appropriation Act 1896 (60 Vict No 62)
The Public Works Lands Act 1864 (28 Vict No 5)

United Kingdom
The Public Works Loans Act 1967 (c 61)  
The Public Works Loans Act 1965 (c 63)  
The Public Works Loans Act 1964 (c 9) 
The Public Works Loans Act 1952 (c 3)
The Public Utilities Street Works Act 1950 (c 39) 
The Public Works Loans Act 1946 (c 41) 
The Public Works Loans Act 1944 (c 16)  
The Public Works Loans Act 1911 (c 17)  
The Public Works Loans Act 1887 (c 37)  
The Public Works Loans Act 1882 (c 62) 
The Public Works Loans (Money) Act 1876 (39 & 40 Vict c 31) 
The Public Works Loans Act 1875 (38 & 39 Vict c 89)
The Public Works Loan Commissioners Act 1872 (35 & 36 Vict c 71)
The Public Works and Fisheries Acts Amendment Act 1863 (26 & 27 vict c 81)
The Public Works Loan Act 1853 (16 & 17 Vict c 40)

The Public Works (Ireland) Acts 1831 to 1886 is the collective title of the following Acts:
The Public Works (Ireland) Act 1831 (1 & 2 Will 4 c 33)
The Public Works (Ireland) Act 1836 (6 & 7 Will 4 c 108)
The Public Works (Ireland) Act 1837 (7 Will 4 & 1 Vict c 21)
The Public Works (Ireland) Act 1839 (2 & 3 Vict c 50)
The Public Works (Ireland) (No 1) Act 1846 (9 & 10 Vict c 1)
The Public Works (Ireland) (No.2) Act 1846 (9 & 10 Vict c 86)
The Public Works (Ireland) Act 1856 (19 & 20 Vict c 18)
The Public Works (Ireland) Act 1861 (24 & 25 Vict c 71)
The Public Works (Ireland) Act 1866 (29 & 30 Vict c 73)
The Public Works (Ireland) Act 1869 (32 & 33 Vict c 74)
The Public Works Loans (Ireland) Act 1877 (40 & 41 Vict c 27)
The Public Works Loans (Ireland) Act 1886 (49 & 50 Vict c 46)

See also
List of short titles

References

Lists of legislation by short title